Richard Clay may refer to:

 Dick Clay (Richard Harold 'Dick' Clay, born 1945), Australian rules footballer
 Sir Richard Henry Clay, 7th Baronet (born 1940) of the Clay baronets

See also
 Clay (disambiguation)